Forensic handwriting examination may refer to:

questioned document examination
forensic palaeography or diplomatics